Be Kind to the Killer is a 1952 detective novel by the British writer Henry Wade. As with many of his works it is written in the style of a police procedural.

A review by Julian Symons in the Times Literary Supplement observed that "Mr. Wade’s writing is pedestrian and at times faintly comic" although concluded "But Be Kind to the Killer is a sound piece of work, which contains some interesting details of police procedure."

Synopsis
When his childhood friend and fellow police officer is killed on duty, Detective Constable Henry Campion takes it on his own shoulders to singlehandedly bring those responsible to justice.

References

Bibliography
 Magill, Frank Northen . Critical Survey of Mystery and Detective Fiction: Authors, Volume 4. Salem Press, 1988.
 Nevins, Francis M. The Mystery Writer's Art. Bowling Green University Popular Press, 1971. 
 Reilly, John M. Twentieth Century Crime & Mystery Writers. Springer, 2015.

1952 British novels
Novels by Henry Wade
British detective novels
British crime novels
British thriller novels
Constable & Co. books
Novels set in London